Georg Konermann (born 24 June 1960) is a German rower. He competed in the men's coxed four event at the 1984 Summer Olympics.

References

External links
 

1960 births
Living people
German male rowers
Olympic rowers of West Germany
Rowers at the 1984 Summer Olympics
People from Rheine
Sportspeople from Münster (region)